The Thirty-Fourth Wisconsin Legislature convened from  to  in regular session.

This was the first legislative session after the 1880 United States census, and—as prescribed by the Wisconsin Constitution—this legislature attempted to pass a redistricting law.  For the first time, the Legislature failed in this task due to a technical problem with the proposed legislation—they forgot to include the town of Ridgeway, in Iowa County.  The Governor vetoed the legislation due to this technical fault.  Since the Legislature had already adjourned for the year, it was considered too late to complete redistricting before the 1881 election.

Senators representing odd-numbered districts were newly elected for this session and were serving the first year of a two-year term. Assembly members were elected to a one-year term. Assembly members and odd-numbered senators were elected in the general election of November 2, 1880. Senators representing even-numbered districts were serving the second year of their two-year term, having been elected in the general election held on November 4, 1879.

Major events
 January 4, 1881: Joseph E. Darbellay was elected to the Wisconsin State Assembly from the Kewaunee County district to fill the vacancy caused by the resignation of John Milton Read.
 January 26, 1881: Philetus Sawyer elected United States Senator by the Wisconsin Legislature in Joint Session.
 February 24, 1881: Wisconsin's senior United States Senator Matthew H. Carpenter died of kidney disease in Washington, D.C.
 March 4, 1881: Inauguration of James A. Garfield as the 20th President of the United States.
 March 13, 1881: Tsar Alexander II of Russia was assassinated in Saint Petersburg.
 March 14, 1881: Angus Cameron elected United States Senator by the Wisconsin Legislature in Joint Session.
 April 4, 1881: Wisconsin Governor William E. Smith vetoed the proposed legislative redistricting act due to a technical flaw in the legislation.
 May 21, 1881: American Red Cross was founded at Dansville, New York.
 July 2, 1881: U.S. President James A. Garfield was shot by an assassin in Washington, D.C.
 September 19, 1881: U.S. President James A. Garfield died of an infected gunshot wound.
 September 20, 1881: Inauguration of Chester A. Arthur as the 21st President of the United States.
 November 8, 1881: Jeremiah McLain Rusk elected Governor of Wisconsin.
 November 8, 1881: At the state's general election, Wisconsin voters approved an amendment to the Constitution of Wisconsin.  The amendment doubled the terms of Wisconsin legislators—Assembly terms went from 1 year to 2 years; Senate terms went from 2 years to 4 years.  The amendment also adjusted the frequency of legislative sessions from annual to biennial, with new sessions beginning in odd-numbered years.

Major legislation
 March 19, 1881: An Act to provide for more light on various subjects, 1881 Act 110.  Directed the governor to implement electric lighting in the Wisconsin capitol building.
 April 2, 1881: An Act relating to state officers and making the railroad commissioner and commissioner of insurance elective, as other state officers, and prescribing their duties and salary, and amendatory of sections one hundred and twenty-eight and one thousand nine hundred and sixty-seven of the revised statutes, and to repeal section one thousand seven hundred and ninety-two of the revised statutes, and amendatory of section six of chapter two hundred and forty of the laws of 1880, 1881 Act 300.  Converted the offices of insurance commissioner and railroad commissioner to statewide elected offices, rather than gubernatorial appointees.
 Joint Resolution amending sections number four, five, eleven and twenty-one, article four of the constitution of the state of Wisconsin, 1881 Joint Resolution 7. This was the required second legislative resolution supporting the amendment to change the length of legislative terms.  The amendment was ratified by voters in the November 1881 general election.
 Joint Resolution proposing amendments to section four of article six, section twelve of article seven, and section one of article thirteen of the constitution of the state of Wisconsin, so as to provide for biennial general elections, 1881 Joint Resolution 16.  Proposed changes to the state constitution to bring all terms for county officers into uniformity, with elections taking place in even-numbered years.  This was the first legislative approval for this amendment, a second legislative approval was passed in 1882, and the amendment was ratified by the voters in the November 1882 general election.

Party summary

Senate summary

Assembly summary

Sessions
 1st Regular session: January 12, 1881April 4, 1881

Leaders

Senate leadership
 President of the Senate: James M. Bingham (R)
 President pro tempore: Thomas B. Scott (R)

Assembly leadership
 Speaker of the Assembly: Ira B. Bradford (R)

Members

Members of the Senate
Members of the Senate for the Thirty-Fourth Wisconsin Legislature:

Members of the Assembly
Members of the Assembly for the Thirty-Fourth Wisconsin Legislature:

Employees

Senate employees
 Chief Clerk: Charles E. Bross
 Assistant Clerk: Charles N. Herreid
 Bookkeeper: Oliver Munson
 Engrossing Clerk: John P. Mitchell
 Enrolling Clerk: L. J. Burlingame
 Transcribing Clerk: C. Ingersoll
 Proofreader: Henry Eduard Legler
 Clerk for the Judiciary Committee: Charles Simeon Taylor
 Clerk for the Committee on Enrolled Bills: R. B. Blackstone
 Document Clerk: Frank Hutson
 Sergeant-at-Arms: W. W. Baker
 Assistant Sergeant-at-Arms: Charles A. Langridge
 Postmaster: J. L. Thwing
 Assistant Postmaster: L. E. Spencer
 Gallery Attendant: J. J. Marshall
 Doorkeepers: 
 F. O. Janzen
 M. Quinn
 F. R. Sebenthal
 D. J. F. Murphy
 Porter: O. L. Wright
 Night Watch: A. J. Marsh
 Janitor: Ole Stephenson
 President's Messenger: Ralph Irish
 Chief Clerk's Messenger: J. G. Hyland
 Messengers: 
 Perry Carrell
 William Burnett
 John L. Bohm
 Charles Bucey
 Albert Fontaine
 George Kinney

Assembly employees
 Chief Clerk: John E. Eldred
 1st Assistant Clerk: J. F. A. Williams
 2nd Assistant Clerk: Peter Philippi
 Bookkeeper: J. T. Huntington
 Engrossing Clerk: P. H. Swift
 Enrolling Clerk: George E. Weatherby
 Transcribing Clerk: Francis Stirn
 Proof Reader: Fred W. Coon
 Sergeant-at-Arms: George W. Church
 Assistant Sergeant-at-Arms: J. B. Perry
 Postmaster: W. W. Sturtevant
 Assistant Postmaster: George Slingsby
 Doorkeepers: 
 R. N. Potter
 Charles Rediske
 W. L. Peterson
 Darwin C. Pavey
 Gallery Attendant: L. T. Stohland
 Night Watch: Lonis J. Neiman
 Wash Room Attendant: Frank Lynch
 Messengers:
 Eddie Cavanaugh
 Thomas Gillespie
 Thomas Wilkinson
 William A. Price
 Hugh Edwards
 James Daley
 Fred Moll
 Hayes Selden
 Louis E. Bainbridge
 Thomas Bullock
 R. G. Thomas
 Frederick G. Isenring

References

External links
 1881: Related Documents from Wisconsin Legislature

1881 in Wisconsin
Wisconsin
Wisconsin legislative sessions